Sir Arthur James de la Mare  (15 February 1914 – 15 December 1994) was a British diplomat. He rose to the rank of High Commissioner of Singapore, and was a leading authority on Asian affairs to the British Foreign Office.

Life and career
Arthur James de la Mare was born into a farming family in Saint John, Jersey. He grew up speaking the Norman French patois of his native island. He was educated at Victoria College, Jersey, then won a scholarship to Pembroke College, Cambridge, where he gained a double first in modern languages. He joined the Foreign Service in 1936 and served in Tokyo, Seoul, San Francisco and Washington, D.C.

De la Mare was acting consul general to Seoul by 1938 when the consul general fell ill and had to return to Britain. At the time he had nothing more than two years' Japanese language training.

Upon his arrival in Seoul in the late 1930s he was acting consul general, and then the vice consul promptly retired, and De la Mare took on his responsibilities as well. De la Mare had no consular training at this stage. He was later appointed head of the Far Eastern department of the Foreign Office.

He was appointed ambassador to Afghanistan 1963–65, High Commissioner in Singapore 1968–70 and ambassador to Thailand 1970–73.

De la Mare oversaw the transition to independence from Britain whilst High Commissioner for Singapore. De la Mare expressed his anger that the British military bases on the island were handed over to the Singapore People's Action Party government. De la Mare's valedictory dispatches from Thailand and Singapore are included in Matthew Parris's book Parting Shots (Penguin, 2011). In a view that was considered old-fashioned at the time, De la Mare maintained that the British Empire could be a force for good around the world.

De la Mare was appointed CMG in 1957, and knighted KCMG in 1968. After the Queen's visit to Thailand in 1972 she gave him the additional knighthood of KCVO and the King of Thailand made him a Knight Grand Cross of the Order of the White Elephant.

He lived in the 1960s and 1970s in Walton on Thames, Surrey.  He had an impish sense of humour.  One of his neighbours saw Sir Arthur, somewhat shabbily dressed, doing the gardening in 1965.  Assuming he was a hired hand, The neighbour asked him whether he would be willing to do the gardening at his house. Sir Arthur readily agreed.  It took him some weeks to reveal to his neighbour that he was the ex-ambassador to Afghanistan and a Knight of the British Empire.

De la Mare had retired to his native Jersey by 1991.

Publications
de la Mare, Sir Arthur Perverse and Foolish: A Jersey farmer's Son in the British Diplomatic Service, La Haule Books, Jersey, 1994

References

External links

de la MARE, Sir Arthur (James), Who Was Who, A & C Black, 1920–2007; online edn, Oxford University Press, Dec 2012
Sir Arthur de la Mare (obituary), The Times, London, 5 January 1995, page 21
Obituaries : Sir Arthur de la Mare, The Independent, London, 31 December 1994

1914 births
1994 deaths
Jersey people
People educated at Victoria College, Jersey
Alumni of Pembroke College, Cambridge
Ambassadors of the United Kingdom to Afghanistan
High Commissioners of the United Kingdom to Singapore
Ambassadors of the United Kingdom to Thailand
Knights Commander of the Order of St Michael and St George
Knights Commander of the Royal Victorian Order